Maengsan Airport(맹산비행장) is an airport in Pyongan-namdo, North Korea.

Facilities 
The airfield has a single grass runway 10/29 measuring 9550 x 207 feet (2911 x 63 m).

References 

Airports in North Korea
North Pyongan